The College Boob is a 1926 American comedy film directed by Harry Garson and written by Gerald Duffy. The film stars Maurice Bennett Flynn, Jean Arthur, Jimmy Anderson, Bob Steele, Cecil Ogden and Dorothea Wolbert. The film was released on August 15, 1926, by Film Booking Offices of America.

Cast       
Maurice Bennett Flynn as Aloysius Appleby
Jean Arthur as Angela Boothby
Jimmy Anderson as Horatio Winston Jr.
Bob Steele as Shorty Buzelle 
Cecil Ogden as Smacky McNeil
Dorothea Wolbert as Aunt Polly
William Malan as Uncle Lish
Ray Turner as Whitewings Washington

References

External links
 

1926 films
1920s English-language films
Silent American comedy films
1926 comedy films
Film Booking Offices of America films
American silent feature films
American black-and-white films
Films with screenplays by Gerald Duffy
Films directed by Harry Garson
1920s American films